Stanisław Józef Lamczyk (born 12 August 1957 in Brusy) is a Polish politician. He was elected to the Sejm on 25 September 2005, getting 6,276 votes in 26 Gdynia district as a candidate from the Civic Platform list.

See also
Members of Polish Sejm 2005-2007

External links
Stanisław Lamczyk - parliamentary page - includes declarations of interest, voting record, and transcripts of speeches.

Civic Platform politicians
1957 births
Living people
Members of the Polish Sejm 2005–2007
Members of the Polish Sejm 2007–2011
Members of the Polish Sejm 2011–2015
Members of the Polish Sejm 2015–2019
Members of the Senate of Poland 2019–2023
People from Brusy